The Maltese Third Division 2009–10 (known as BOV 3rd Division 2009–10 due to sponsorship reasons) was the 10th season of the Maltese Third Division. It started in September 2009 and ended in May 2010 with the promotion play-offs. Naxxar Lions, Mgarr United and Marsa were relegated from the 2008–09 Maltese Second Division.

The division is divided into two sections (Section A and Section B), both with 10 teams. The winners of each section faced each other in a play-off where the winner was crowned as champion of the division, but both teams were still given the promotion.

Mgarr United won Section A, while Zejtun Corinthians won Section B after a decider with Naxxar Lions. In the Championship play-off Zejtun bet Mgarr 4–3 to win the Division.

In the promotion play-offs semi-final Gudja United beat Santa Venera, who finished 10th in the Second Division. In the final Naxxar Lions defeated Gudja on penalties to win promotion.

This was the debut season of Swieqi United.

Clubs

Section A

 Fgura United
 Ghaxaq
 Kalkara
 Luqa SA
 Marsa
 Mdina Knights
 Mgarr United
 Mtarfa
 Pembroke A.
 Siggiewi

Section B

 Attard
 Gudja United
 Kirkop United
 Naxxar Lions
 Qrendi
 Santa Lucia
 Sirens
 Swieqi United
 Xghajra T.
 Zejtun C.

Changes from previous season
 Gzira United, Gharghur and Zurrieq were promoted to 2009–10 Maltese Second Division. They were replaced with Naxxar Lions, Mgarr United and Marsa, all relegated from the 2008–09 Maltese Second Division

League table

Section A

Section B

|+ Championship decider

|}

Champions playoff

|}

Promotion-relegation play-off
Participating

Quarter final 

|}

Ghaxaq remain in Maltese Third Division

Semi finals

|}

Mdina Knights remain in Maltese Third Division
St. Venera Lightning relegated to Maltese Third Division

Final

|}

Results

Section A

Section B

Maltese Third Division seasons
4
Malta